The 1961–62 season was the 6th season of the Liga Española de Baloncesto. R. Madrid won their title.

Teams and venues

League table

Stats Leaders

Points

Notes
1. Espanyol was docked 1 point
2. Espanyol withdrawn, UD Montgat promoted.  
3. Iberia withdrawn, Tritones promoted.

References

ACB.com 
linguasport 

Liga Española de Baloncesto (1957–1983) seasons
1961–62 in Spanish basketball